Phenoxyacetic acid, POA, is a white solid with the formula of C8H8O3. Although not itself usefully active as an herbicide, it forms the part-structure of many phenoxy herbicide derivatives including MCPA and papaya fermentada2,4-D.

Structure and synthesis 
Phenoxyacetic acid is an O-phenyl derivative of glycolic acid. It is both a monocarboxylic acid and an aryl ether. Its preparation from sodium phenolate and sodium chloroacetate in hot water was first reported in 1880.

1) C6H5O−Na+  +  ClCH2COO−Na+  →  C6H5OCH2COO−Na+ + NaCl

2) C6H5OCH2COO−Na+ + HCl →  C6H5OCH2COOH + NaCl

The phenolate anion reacts via nucleophilic attack on the methylene carbon of the chloroacetic acid, forming an ether bond.

Properties 
Phenoxyacetic acid is a white or clear crystalline compound at room temperature. When impure, it can appear to be a light tan to brown. The compound has a solubility in water of 12 g/L and is highly soluble in organic solvents including ethanol, diethyl ether and benzene. Phenoxyacetic acid is a weak acid and weak base with a pKa of  3.7.

Uses 
Phenoxyacetic acid has found minor uses as a food additive and perfume component and is categorised as "generally recognised as safe" in these applications.

References 

Phenoxyacetic acids